The Ramanujan tau function, studied by , is the function  defined by the following identity:

It appears in connection to an "error term" involved in counting the number of ways of expressing an integer as a sum of 24 squares.

Values
The first few values of the tau function are given in the following table :

Ramanujan's conjectures
 observed, but did not prove, the following three properties of :

  if  (meaning that  is a multiplicative function)
  for all primes .

Congruences for the tau function
Here are some:

For  prime, we have
<li>
<li>
<li>

Explicit formula 
In 1975 Douglas Niebur proved an explicit formula for the Ramanujan tau function:

This also shows that the tau function is always an integer.

Conjectures on τ(n)
Suppose that  is a weight- integer newform and the Fourier coefficients  are integers. Consider the problem: 
 Given that  does not have complex multiplication, do almost all primes  have the property that ?
Indeed, most primes should have this property, and hence they are called ordinary. The only theorem in this regard is Elkies' famous result for modular elliptic curves, which guarantees that there are infinitely many primes  such that , which thus are congruent to 0 modulo . Some researchers had begun to doubt whether  for infinitely many . As evidence, many provided Ramanujan's  (case of weight 12).

 conjectured that  for all , an assertion sometimes known as Lehmer's conjecture.

Ramanujan's L-function
Ramanujan's L-function is defined by

if  and by analytic continuation otherwise. It satisfies the functional equation

and has the Euler product

Notes

References

Modular forms
Multiplicative functions
Srinivasa Ramanujan
Zeta and L-functions